Swormville is a hamlet in the eastern part of Amherst and the western part of Clarence, New York, United States.

Named after Adam Schworm, a prominent landowner and businessman who built a store on the Clarence side of Transit Road, Swormville has a population of 17,694. Swormville was originally dubbed "Schwormville," and has also been occasionally referred to as "Swormsville."

History 
Bavarian and French immigrants began settling in the Swormville area during the late 1830s following a heavy migration of German people and the subsequent separation of Alden and Newstead. The Rev. John Neumann, a Catholic missionary, founded the "Parish of the Transit", now known as St. Mary's. He used to walk to Swormville from his headquarters in Williamsville.  Immigrants from Palma and Motavia began to settle here in the 1800s as well.

Geography 
The community is bisected by Transit Road, NY Route 78, an important north-south highway.

Swormville is located in Western New York and is northeast of Buffalo.

Schools 
St. Mary's School, with grades PK-08, is a Catholic private school and the only school located in Swormville. 

The public school system is Williamsville.

References

External links
 Swormville community Web Directory
 St. Mary's Church Swormville's church
 Wikipedia page
 St. Mary's School School website

Hamlets in New York (state)
Hamlets in Erie County, New York